The Black Company Campaign Setting is a d20 system Fantasy Role-playing game based on the Black Company book series by Glen Cook.

History
With the Mythic Vistas series, Green Ronin Publishing moved in the direction of licensing, including The Black Company (2004) which was based on The Black Company novel series by Glen Cook. Green Ronin published the Black Company hardcover as one of several highly expensive books despite the company's financial problems at the time.

Reception
Black Company won the Silver ENnie Award for "Best Campaign Setting or Setting Supplement" in 2005.

References

 Green Ronin's Mythic Vistas: The Black Company Campaign Setting (Green Ronin Publishing, 2004)

External links
The Black Company out-of-print product page

D20 System
ENnies winners
Fantasy role-playing games
Green Ronin Publishing games
Role-playing games based on novels
Role-playing games introduced in 2004